State Route 213 (SR 213), also known as Grays Camp Road and Phillippy Road, is a short 3.6 miles long east-west state highway in northeastern Lake County, Tennessee. It provides access to many homes, marinas, businesses, and camps along the shores of Reelfoot Lake, as well as the Reelfoot Lake Airport.

Route description

SR 213 begins as Grays Camp Road just south of the community of Phillippy at an intersection with SR 78. It goes southeast through farmland for a couple of miles before arriving at some lakeside camps, such as Gray’s Camp, where it turns northeast along Phillippy Road. For the next mile or so, SR 213 travels along the banks of Reelfoot Lake, passing by many lakeside homes, camps, businesses, and marinas, before turning more northward away from the lake and coming to an end at the main entrance of Reelfoot Lake Airport. The Phillippy Road portion of the highway stays no more than a half-mile west of the Obion County line at all times. The entire route of SR 213 is a two-lane highway.

Major intersections

References

213
Transportation in Lake County, Tennessee